L-saccharopine oxidase (FAP2) is an enzyme with systematic name L-saccharopine:oxygen oxidoreductase (L-glutamate forming). This enzyme catalyses the following chemical reaction

 N6-(L-1,3-dicarboxypropyl)-L-lysine + H2O + O2  (S)-2-amino-6-oxohexanoate + L-glutamate + H2O2

The enzyme is involved in pipecolic acid biosynthesis.

References

External links 
 

EC 1.5.3